Kurdish dances are a group of traditional dances among Kurds. It is a form of a circle dance, with a single or a couple of figure dancers often added to the geometrical center of the dancing circle. At times musicians playing on a drum or a double reed wind instrument known as a zurna, accompany the dancers. Often there are dancers twirling handkerchiefs who lead the half-circled group of dancers. The dancers, generally the females, but also, on occasions, the males, wear traditional Kurdish clothes. The Kurds dance on several occasions such as Kurdish festivals, birthdays, New Years, Newroz, marriage and other ceremonies and the dances have several names which often relate to local names and traditions.

See also
 Kurdish culture
 Armenian dance
 Assyrian folk dance
 Dabke (a form of Arabic dance)
 Syrtos (Greek) 
 Turkish dance

References

 
Kurdish culture
Kurdish folklore
Folk dances